The Streaming Songs chart is released weekly by Billboard magazine and lists each week's top streamed radio songs, on-demand songs and videos on leading online music services in the United States. The chart represents one of the three components, along with airplay (Hot 100 Airplay) and sales (Hot Digital Songs and Hot Singles Sales), that determine the chart positions of songs on the Billboard Hot 100, which ranks the most popular songs in the United States.

Billboard editorial director Bill Werde said that "Harlem Shake"'s success prompted them to enact the chart policy after two years of discussions with YouTube". The first number-one song on the chart was "Thrift Shop" by Macklemore & Ryan Lewis featuring Wanz on January 19, 2013.

Chart achievements

Songs with the most weeks at number one

Source:

Highest stream peaks
 143 million, "Old Town Road" – Lil Nas X featuring Billy Ray Cyrus (April 20, 2019)
 116.2 million, "In My Feelings" – Drake (July 28, 2018)
 103.1 million, "Harlem Shake" – Baauer (March 2, 2013)
 101.7 million, "God's Plan" – Drake (March 3, 2018)
 93.8 million, "Thank U, Next" – Ariana Grande (December 15, 2018)
 93 million, "WAP" – Cardi B featuring Megan Thee Stallion (August 22, 2020)
 85.3 million, "7 Rings" – Ariana Grande (February 2, 2019)
 84.5 million, "Look What You Made Me Do" – Taylor Swift (September 16, 2017)
 77.2 million, "The Box" – Roddy Ricch (January 25, 2020)
 76.1 million, "Drivers License" – Olivia Rodrigo (January 23, 2021)
 72.2 million, "All I Want for Christmas Is You" – Mariah Carey (January 4, 2020)

Source:

Artists with the most number-one singles

Artists with the most weeks at number one

Selected additional Streaming Songs achievements 
 Mariah Carey's "All I Want for Christmas Is You" is the first and only holiday song to reach number one on Streaming Songs. It achieved this on the chart dated January 5, 2019, with 51.9 million streams.
 Lil Nas X and Billy Ray Cyrus' "Old Town Road" is the first song to garner over 100 million streams in nine separate weeks.
 Cardi B's "WAP" featuring Megan Thee Stallion holds the record for greatest first-week streams, with 93 million.
 Bad Bunny and Chencho Corleone' "Me Porto Bonito" is the first song completely in Spanish to reach number one on Streaming Songs. It achieved this on the chart dated July 30, 2022, with 21.1 million streams.
 Taylor Swift and Drake share the record of being the only artists ever to hold the entire top ten of the chart in a week and the only artists to have debuted ten songs in the top ten simultaneously.

References

Billboard charts